= IUsask =

Released in 2009, iUsask was Canada's first iPhone app created for university students. The app offered personalized class schedule, grades, news, library access, a campus map, final exam schedule, webcams and many other features. The app creation was a collaboration between the University of Saskatchewan, University of Saskatchewan Computer Science Department, and the team that later became Push Interactions. The project required tying together many different systems, including Banner, Moodle, iHelp and eHandin, to offer the features. The app was covered nationwide by many news organizations because it was the first of its kind for university students in Canada and it contained a wide range of features as a result of the collaboration across the University of Saskatchewan on the project. With the motto "iUsask puts the University of Saskatchewan in your pocket!", the work was a collaboration of many people from the University of Saskatchewan.
